"Damaged" is a song by American recording group TLC. It was written by band member Tionne "T-Boz" Watkins and long time contributor Dallas Austin and recorded for the band's fourth studio album, 3D (2002), the latter also serving as its producer. The lyrics of the song talk about freedom and healing from hurt and pain.

The song was released as the album's second international single and third US single from the album on March 7, 2003, and internationally on June 16, 2003. On the Billboard Hot 100, "Damaged" peaked at number 53. The song was included on both of the group's official greatest hits albums: Now & Forever: The Hits and 20.

Background
Dallas Austin originally wrote another song titled "Cool" for TLC. However, Austin felt reluctant to give them the song after breaking up with TLC member Chilli. Austin recalled it for Billboard:

As a result, Austin decided to give "Cool" to Gwen Stefani for her debut solo album Love. Angel. Music. Baby., and instead wrote another song for TLC with a slightly similar concept:

Critical reception
David Browne from Entertainment Weekly called the track "a genuinely uplifting song about being emotionally screwed up, benefits tremendously from the use of live instruments rather than samples." Slant Magazine Sal Cinquemani called the track "poignant."

Music video
In the music video for the song, directed by Joseph Kahn, a young woman, (played by actress Justina Machado) works two jobs to support her family. One day she comes home and finds her boyfriend in bed with another girl. After confronting him, he hits her. She then finds herself stuck in an abusive relationship as well as trying to look after her child. She finds herself torn and unsure of what to do, eventually literally falling to pieces at the end of the video as she crumbles into hundreds of tiny jigsaw puzzle pieces. It shows other "damaged" women falling to pieces. The lead woman is shown to be put back together by her daughter, and she's happy now.

Track listing

Notes
 denotes additional producer
 denotes additional co-producer
Sample credits
"Hands Up" (So So Def Remix)" contains portions from "Nasty Boy" as performed by The Notorious B.I.G.

Charts

References

2003 singles
TLC (group) songs
Music videos directed by Joseph Kahn
Song recordings produced by Dallas Austin
Songs written by Dallas Austin
Songs written by Tionne Watkins
2002 songs
Arista Records singles
American pop rock songs
Pop rock songs